Fighting Blood is a 1951 short Australian documentary about boxing in Australia.

It included footage of boxers such as Les Darcy, Dave Sands, Jack Hassen, Alfie Clay, Elley Bennett, Freddie Dawson, Vic Patrick, Ron Richards and Fred Henneberry.

The Adelaide Advertiser called the film short, but brilliantly produced... In 18 minutes' screen time is packed the neatest, crispest KO to the wise acres that could be imagined even by the American movie experts."

References

External links
Fighting Blood at Australian Screen Online
Fighting Blood at National Film and Sound Archive

1951 films
1950s sports films
Australian short documentary films
Documentary films about boxing
1951 documentary films
Australian black-and-white films
1950s short documentary films
1950s English-language films